The 2013–14 North Texas Mean Green men's basketball team represented the University of North Texas during the 2012–13 NCAA Division I men's basketball season. The Mean Green, led by second year head coach Tony Benford, played their home games at UNT Coliseum, nicknamed The Super Pit,  and were first year members of Conference USA. They finished the season 16–16, 6–10 in C-USA play to finish 11th place. They advanced to the second round of the C-USA tournament where they lost to Tulane.

Roster

Schedule
 
|-
!colspan=9 style="background:#059033; color:#000000;"| Exhibition

|-
!colspan=9 style="background:#059033; color:#000000;"| Regular season

|-
!colspan=9 style="background:#059033; color:#000000;"| 2014 Conference USA tournament

See also
2013–14 North Texas Mean Green women's basketball team

References

North Texas Mean Green men's basketball seasons
North Texas